The Abdul Ahad Azad Memorial College Bemina (Urdu;) formerly known as GDC Bemina, Government Degree College, Bemina is a University Grants Commission autonomous college in the Indian state of Jammu and Kashmir located on 300 Kanal (37.5 acre) campus in state summer capital Srinagar. It is affiliated with the Cluster University of Srinagar.It was established in the year 1970.The college has the largest campus in the state of Jammu and Kashmir spread over 300 kanal of land.

It has been awarded grade "A" by the NAAC.

Location 

Establishment 
The college has been established during the reign of the then Chief Minister of J&K state Ghulam Mohamad Sadiq in the year 1970. It started academic operations in the year 1972.

Degrees offered 
 Bachelor of Arts
 Bachelor of Arts (humanities)
 Bachelor of Science (medical)
 Bachelor of Science (non-medical)
 Bachelor of Science (electronics)
 Bachelor of Commerce (general)
 Bachelor of Commerce (Honours) 
 B.Voc(Banking & Financial Services) 
 i-MCom,i-MBA
 Bachelor of Business Administration
 Master of Commerce
 Integrated Political Science
 Integrated History

References 

Degree colleges in Kashmir Division
Universities and colleges in Jammu and Kashmir
University of Kashmir
Colleges affiliated to Cluster University of Srinagar